Little Springs is an unincorporated community in Franklin County, Mississippi.

The Homochitto National Forest is located a short distance west of the community along Little Springs Road.

The community was named for the large number of springs located there.

The first school was the Magnolia School, built in 1854.  A new school, the Little Springs High School, replaced it in 1901.

A post office was in operation in the early 1900s.

Notable people
 Moze Hunt Jones, member of the Mississippi House of Representatives from 1908 to 1914
 Dan R. McGehee, U.S. Representative from Mississippi.
 William Madison Whittington, U.S. Representative from Mississippi.

References

Unincorporated communities in Franklin County, Mississippi
Unincorporated communities in Mississippi